Conus bellulus is a species of sea snail, a marine gastropod mollusk in the family Conidae, the cone snails and their allies.

Like all species within the genus Conus, these snails are predatory and venomous. They are capable of "stinging" humans, therefore live ones should be handled carefully or not at all.

Description
The size of the shell varies between 17 mm and 22 mm.

Distribution
This species occurs in the Atlantic Ocean, where it is restricted to the islands of São Vicente and Santa Luzia, Cape Verde.

References

 Rolán E. (1990) Descripcion de nuevas especies y subespecies del genero Conus (Mollusca, Neogastropoda) para el archipielago de Cabo Verde. Iberus Supplement 2: 5–70, 9 pls. page(s): 44
  Puillandre N., Duda T.F., Meyer C., Olivera B.M. & Bouchet P. (2015). One, four or 100 genera? A new classification of the cone snails. Journal of Molluscan Studies. 81: 1–23

External links
 The Conus Biodiversity website
 

bellulus
Gastropods of Cape Verde
Gastropods described in 1990